Lázaro Reinoso (born December 9, 1969) is a Cuban wrestler. He was Olympic bronze medalist in Freestyle wrestling in 1992. He won a silver medal at the 1993 World Wrestling Championships.

NCAA Career 

Reinoso was a NCAA Division II All-American in 1998 and 1999 at Carson Newman.

International career 

He is also a bronze medalist for Cuba at the 1992 Olympic Games in Barcelona, Spain.

References

External links

1969 births
Living people
Olympic wrestlers of Cuba
Wrestlers at the 1992 Summer Olympics
Cuban male sport wrestlers
Olympic bronze medalists for Cuba
Olympic medalists in wrestling
Medalists at the 1992 Summer Olympics
Pan American Games medalists in wrestling
Pan American Games bronze medalists for Cuba
Wrestlers at the 1991 Pan American Games
World Wrestling Championships medalists
Medalists at the 1991 Pan American Games
20th-century Cuban people
21st-century Cuban people